Spring Valley is an unincorporated town and census-designated place in Clark County, Nevada, United States, located  west of the Las Vegas Strip. The population was 215,597 at the 2020 census. Spring Valley was formed in May 1981.

History
In 1965, the Stardust International Raceway was built by the Stardust Resort and Casino. In 1969, the Stardust was sold to the Parvin-Dohrmann Corporation, which had little interest in the raceway and then leased it until 1970, when Pardee Homes purchased the land. They began developing a master-planned housing community called Spring Valley. The community was named by Doug Pardee and sales manager Jack Whiteman, in reference to its views of the Spring Mountains and its location in the Las Vegas Valley. In 1981, residents grouped together to solicit the Clark County Commission to create an unincorporated town, which it did that May. The residents wanted to create the town due to hypothetical annexations into other communities in the Las Vegas Valley, and because they claimed they did not pay their taxes fairly for county services. The town originally encompassed , but now occupies much of the southwest quarter of the Las Vegas Valley, totaling .

Geography

The predominant boundaries of Spring Valley are Sahara Avenue on the north, Decatur Boulevard on the east, Warm Springs Road on the south, and Hualapai Way on the west.

The area mostly consists of housing subdivisions, with strip malls lining the large boulevards that connect suburban Las Vegas to the Strip. The southern part of Spring Valley is quickly developing – fifteen years ago, very little south of Tropicana Avenue was developed within Spring Valley.

A large park, Desert Breeze Park, is located in the north-central part of the town. Next to the park is Roger M. Bryan Elementary School.

Demographics

At the census of 2010, there were 178,395 people living in the CDP. The racial makeup was 57.9% White, 9.8% African American, 0.6% Native American, 17.4% Asian, 0.8% Pacific Islander, and 5.0% from two or more races. Hispanic or Latino of any race were 20.6% of the population and 48.1% of the population was non-Hispanic White.

As of the census of 2000, there were 117,390 people, 47,964 households, and 29,929 families living in the CDP. The racial makeup of the CDP was 72.60% White, 5.29% African American, 0.60% Native American, 11.21% Asian, 0.48% Pacific Islander, 5.14% from other races, and 4.67% from two or more races. Hispanic or Latino of any race were 13.77% of the population.

There were 47,964 households, out of which 27.0% had children under the age of 18 living with them, 46.7% were married couples living together, 10.5% had a female householder with no husband present, and 37.6% were non-families. 25.9% of all households were made up of individuals, and 5.9% had someone living alone who was 65 years of age or older. The average household size was 2.44 and the average family size was 2.98.

In the CDP, the population was spread out, with 21.2% under the age of 18, 9.4% from 18 to 24, 33.7% from 25 to 44, 25.0% from 45 to 64, and 10.7% who were 65 years of age or older. The median age was 36 years. For every 100 females, there were 99.6 males. For every 100 females age 18 and over, there were 98.4 males.

The median income for a household in the CDP was $48,563, and the median income for a family was $55,021. Males had a median income of $37,068 versus $28,288 for females. The per capita income for the CDP was $26,321. About 4.8% of families and 6.7% of the population were below the poverty line, including 6.9% of those under age 18 and 7.7% of those age 65 or over.

Culture

Residents
Spring Valley is the home of tennis players Andre Agassi and Steffi Graf, as well as former Sacramento Kings owners George J. Maloof, Jr. The Sultan of Brunei keeps a residence there, and Carrot Top has his Las Vegas residence in the area. NASCAR drivers Kurt and Kyle Busch attended Durango High School in Spring Valley, as did actress Cerina Vincent and BMX celebrity T. J. Lavin. Kris Bryant lived in Spring Valley. Nevada governor Steve Sisolak keeps his private residence in Spring Valley.

Chinatown

The strip malls along Spring Mountain Road and surrounding streets, from Valley View to Jones Boulevard in Spring Valley into Paradise, house many ethnic Chinese and other pan-Asian businesses, with the original called Chinatown Plaza. The district is primarily a retail destination, rather than a residential enclave, catering to Asian Americans.

The Chinatown Plaza strip mall was conceived by Taiwanese American James Chih-Cheng Chen and opened in February 1995 at the corner of Spring Mountain and Wynn; it has  of space and was designed by Simon Lee in a style inspired by Tang Dynasty buildings. Chen called it "America's first master-planned Chinatown". The plaza was funded by JHK Investment Group, Inc., which Chen had formed with two high school classmates: Henry Chen-Jen Hwang and K.C. Chen (no relation). James Chen, an emigrant from Taiwan who arrived in Los Angeles in 1971 with $30, saw a demand for Asian food and restaurants: "I see so many Asian tourists here [in Las Vegas], but I see no Asian business people. They're happy with everything in Las Vegas except the food." Sharon Hwang, Henry's daughter, recalled her father was similarly inspired by stories he would hear from tourists returning from Las Vegas to Los Angeles: "... We figured all the Southern California Chinese, they love to come to Vegas, gambling; that was the thing. So they would come average, I would say, once or twice a year at least. But everybody's thing was, there's no Chinese food; there's no good Chinese food in Las Vegas, nothing authentic, just nothing really. It was kind of a joke almost in California." By 1996, the plaza was visited by approximately 3,000 to 5,000 daily, and Chen was planning to open the Far East Trade Center later that year for manufacturers to exhibit their goods.

Clark County designated Chinatown Plaza as the Asian Pacific American Cultural Center on May 7, 1996, the first official recognition of the new district. Nevada Governor Kenny Guinn officially designated the  district along Spring Mountain from Las Vegas Boulevard to Rainbow Boulevard as Chinatown in October 1999 and it continues to grow as the Asian population in Las Vegas expands rapidly. The Chinatown area has gained much popularity, receiving national attention in a 2004 article by The Wall Street Journal. Huffington Post classifies the Chinatowns in Las Vegas, Atlanta-Chamblee, Dallas-Richardson, and North Miami Beach as "modern" styled Chinatown, in contrast with the historic core Chinatowns in New York and San Francisco. The Las Vegas Chinatown is pan-Asian in nature instead of being completely Chinese according to the previous source. The official website for the Chinatown Plaza indicates that Spring Mountain Road is the general corridor for the neighborhood.

The history of Chinese population in the Las Vegas Valley shows that the Chinese population remained small throughout most of its history. As a result, a Chinatown could only be created with initiative from entrepreneurs that would in essence fabricate a scenario that came naturally in other large cities that have historically important Chinatowns. According to Bonnie Tsui, Las Vegas's Chinese population boomed starting from the 1960s and by the 1990s, the Chinese population grew to 15,000 with the majority working in the casino industry. Even as the population grew, the "Chinatown experiment" could not rely on the local Chinese population to create it, but relied on a label on the plaza itself before people knew it was "Chinatown". In addition, Senator Harry Reid "... ordered a sign to be put up for Chinatown [along Interstate 15]..." but was taken down by the order of the governor of Nevada Bob Miller.

Education
All public schools within Spring Valley are part of the Clark County School District.

Elementary schools
 Roger M. Bryan Elementary School
 Patricia A. Bendorf Elementary School
 C.H. Decker Elementary School
 Harvey Dondero Elementary School
 Marion Earl Elementary School
 Wayne Tanaka Elementary School
 Pat Diskin Elementary School

Middle schools
 Wilbur & Theresa Faiss Middle School
 Victoria Fertitta Middle School
 Kenny Guinn Middle School
 Clifford J. Lawrence Middle School
 Grant Sawyer Middle School
 Lawrence & Heidi Canarelli Middle School

High schools
Durango High School
Spring Valley High School
Bonanza High School
Ed W. Clark High School
Sierra Vista High School

Spring Valley has a public library, a branch of the Las Vegas-Clark County Library District.

Government
Spring Valley's municipal government is the Clark County Commission, which has seven members from across Southern Nevada (and none of whom resided in Spring Valley as of 2006). A five-member Town Advisory Board offers advisory opinions on zoning and business matters to the commission, but the commission is not obligated to respond or be held to those suggestions.

Most of Spring Valley falls within Nevada's 1st Congressional District, but portions west of Durango and south of Russell are within the 3rd District.

See also

 List of census-designated places in Nevada

References

External links

 
 The Spring Valley land-use plan, which includes information on its boundaries
 Spring Valley Town Advisory Board

 
1981 establishments in Nevada
Census-designated places in Clark County, Nevada
Las Vegas Valley
Populated places established in 1981
Unincorporated towns in Nevada